The Australian National Criterium Championships cover several different categories of Australian road bicycle racing events, normally held annually. The elite event is normally held in the December the preceding year, for example the 2009 championships were held on 14 December 2008, and the 2008 championships were held on 2 December 2007. Occasionally the event will be held in January and under 23 events combined with the elite race. Each year the championships are held in a different location, often incorporated in other annual criterium events.

The winners of each event are awarded with a symbolic cycling jersey featuring green and yellow stripes, which can be worn by the rider at other criterium events in the country to show their status as national champion. The champion's stripes can be combined into a sponsored rider's team kit design for this purpose.

Elite

Men

Women

Under 23

Men

Women

Junior / Under 19

Men

Women

See also
Australian National Road Race Championships
Australian National Time Trial Championships
National Road Cycling Championships

References

Cycle racing in Australia
National road cycling championships
Cycling